Lepidochrysops coxii, the Cox's blue, is a butterfly in the family Lycaenidae. It is found in eastern Zimbabwe. The habitat consists of grassland.

Adults have been recorded on wing in October.

References

Butterflies described in 1945
Lepidochrysops
Endemic fauna of Zimbabwe
Butterflies of Africa
Taxa named by Elliot Pinhey